Marasmarcha asiatica is a moth of the family Pterophoridae. It is found in China, Iran and Kazakhstan.

References

Exelastini
Moths described in 1906
Plume moths of Asia
Taxa named by Hans Rebel